List of high-voltage transmission links in Lithuania at voltages higher than  330 kV and/or the 400 kV-grid in Lithuania.

The list does not include links at smaller voltages like 110 kV or less. Lithuania has 13 international 110 kV voltage links: 7 with Belarus, 3 with Russia and 3 with Latvia.

International links

Local links

Proposed local links

References 

 
Lithuania
Lithuania
High-voltage transmission